is a public university in Wakayama, Wakayama, Japan. The predecessor of the school was founded in 1945, and it was chartered as a university in 1948.

External links
 Official website 

Educational institutions established in 1945
Public universities in Japan
Universities and colleges in Wakayama Prefecture
1945 establishments in Japan
Medical schools in Japan